Vittoria is a suburb of the city of Bunbury comprising the Bunbury port. The suburb is located in the local government area of the City of Bunbury.

Bunbury port
The Bunbury port is located in Vittoria. The port lands also extend into the adjacent suburb of Pelican Point.

The Bunbury Harbour Board was created by an act of Parliament to control the port from 1 July 1909. The name was changed to Bunbury Port Authority in October 1967. On 1 October 2014 the Bunbury Port Authority, Albany Port Authority, and Esperance Port Authority merged to become the Southern Ports Authority.

The port distributes products from the South West region worldwide. Rail and road links enable the port to capitalise on cargo throughput. The major commodities that the port caters for are alumina, mineral sands, woodchips, caustic soda and silica sand.

References

External links
Bunbury Port

Suburbs of Bunbury, Western Australia